Böyük Qəcər (also, Bëyuk Kadzhar and Böyük Qacar) is a village and municipality in the Barda Rayon of Azerbaijan.  It has a population of 337.

References 

Populated places in Barda District